The North Coast Open was a professional golf tournament in Australia from 1951 to 1975. It was always held at Coffs Harbour Golf Club in Coffs Harbour, New South Wales. It was a PGA Tour of Australia event from 1973 to 1975.

The name "North Coast Open" was not used until the 1953 championship, the first two events being referred to as Coffs Harbour Golf Club £200 Professional Purse. Initially the event was played over 36 holes, increasing to 54 holes in 1959, and 72 holes in 1962.

The 1974 event was the largest with 188 players; 119 professionals and 69 amateurs. It also had its highest hitherto purse at $A8,000.

Winners

The 1970 event was reduced to 54 holes by bad weather. In 1956 Player beat Berwick in a playoff for the championship but they were tied when determining the prize money.

Source:

Multiple winners
4 wins
Kel Nagle: 1951, 1952, 1954, 1955
Bill Dunk: 1966, 1967, 1970, 1971
2 wins:
Gary Player: 1956, 1957
Frank Phillips: 1960, 1962

References

Former PGA Tour of Australasia events
Golf tournaments in Australia
Golf in New South Wales
Mid North Coast